Jean Gimpel (10 October 1918 – 15 June 1996) was a French historian and medievalist.

Gimpel was one of three sons of a French father, the art dealer René Gimpel, and an English mother, Florence, the youngest sister of Lord Duveen. Gimpel was brought up in luxury in a house in the Bois de Boulogne, though he went on to be educated in both France and Britain. He made his living as a diamond broker before establishing himself as a critic of the concept of the great artist.  
  
During the Second World War Gimpel served in the French resistance, for which he was awarded the Croix de Guerre, the Resistance Medal, and the Legion of Honour.

In 1987 Gimpel became a founding vice-president of the Society for the History of Mediaeval Technology and Science, the British affiliate of AVISTA, and the Association de Villard de Honnecourt. Gimpel believed that the basis of sustainable development in the developing world should be low-tech mediaeval machines that could be built, maintained, repaired, and replaced using local craftsmen and resources.  He was also a founder of Models for Rural Development, part of the Appropriate Technology movement.

Gimpel and his wife Catherine maintained a salon in London in his later years.

Works

Gimpel's published works include:

 The Medieval Machine: The Industrial Revolution of the Middle Ages (originally published in French as La Révolution industrielle du Moyen Âge, Éditions du Seuil, 1975; published in English by Victor Gollancz, 1976; 2nd edition Wildwood House, 1988)
 The Cathedral Builders
 The Cult of Art: Against Art and Artists
 The End of the Future: The Waning of the High-Tech World

Author Ken Follett was inspired and informed by Gimpel's work and later retained him as a consultant while writing The Pillars of the Earth.

References

External links
Website of The Society for the History of Mediaeval Technology and Science

1918 births
1996 deaths
French medievalists
20th-century French historians
French male non-fiction writers
French Resistance members
Recipients of the Croix de Guerre 1939–1945 (France)
Recipients of the Resistance Medal
Recipients of the Legion of Honour
20th-century French male writers